The 1991 Continental Grass Court Championships was an ATP-tennis tournament held in Rosmalen, Netherlands. It was played on outdoor grass courts and was part of the ATP World Series. It was the second edition of the tournament and was held from June 10 through June 16, 1991. Christian Saceanu won the singles title.

Finals

Singles
 Christian Saceanu defeated  Michiel Schapers 6–1, 3–6, 7–5

Doubles
 Hendrik Jan Davids /  Paul Haarhuis defeated  Richard Krajicek /  Jan Siemerink 6–3, 7–6

References

External links
 ITF tournament edition details
 

Rosmalen Grass Court Championships
Ordina Open
Rosmalen Grass Court Championships
Rosmalen Grass Court Championships